The 1903 Mercer Baptists football team represented Mercer University in the 1903 Southern Intercollegiate Athletic Association football season. They finished with a record of 0–1 and were defeated 0–46 in their only contest.

Schedule

References

Mercer
Mercer Bears football seasons
College football winless seasons
Mercer Baptists football